The 2021 Portland 112 was an ARCA Menards Series West race held on September 10, 2021. It was contested over 58—extended from 50 laps due to an overtime finish—laps on the  road course. It was the sixth race of the 2021 ARCA Menards Series West season. David Gilliland Racing driver Taylor Gray, collected his first win of the season.

Background

Entry list 

 (R) denotes rookie driver.
 (i) denotes driver who is ineligible for series driver points.

Practice 

Qualifying 

Starting Lineups

Race

Race results

References 

2021 in sports in Oregon
Portland 112
2021 ARCA Menards Series West